Short Hills is an unincorporated community located within Millburn Township, in Essex County, in the U.S. state of New Jersey. It is a commuter town for residents who work in New York City. As of the 2020 United States Census, the CDP's population was 14,422. For statistical purposes, the United States Census Bureau has defined Short Hills as a census-designated place (CDP).

History

18th century
The area that became Short Hills was initially part of Springfield Township, and its eponymous hills are thought to have played a role in the movement of the Continental Army under George Washington during the Battle of Springfield.  While troops may have been present in the area, the Battle of Short Hills (June 26, 1777) took place in Scotch Plains and Metuchen.

Short Hills began as a planned community when Stewart Hartshorn, who became wealthy from developing, perfecting and manufacturing the self-acting shade roller, purchased  of land in Millburn Township, near the present Hobart Avenue, Parsonage Hill Road, and Chatham Road. Hartshorn's purpose was to create "a harmonious community for people who appreciated nature," and "where natural beauty would not be destroyed by real estate developments, and where people of congenial tastes could dwell together."

Hartshorn chose the name "Short Hills" because it reflected the topography of the region, and also because the local Lenape Native Americans used that same name to describe the region. One local resident suggested that he call his village "Hartshornville," but he refused, quietly content with Short Hills sharing his initials.

19th century

Hartshorn situated his ideal town near enough to a railroad to allow for an easy commute to Hoboken and, from there, to New York City. Hence, his decision in 1879 to build, at his own expense, a railroad station along the original Morris and Essex Railroad line. He also persuaded the United States Post Office to open a branch in his new railroad station in 1880, and in fact, the Post Office has always had a presence in Short Hills from that day and its own ZIP Code, 07078.

Hartshorn deliberately preserved strips of land along the railroad right-of-way from any development west of Old Short Hills Road. These strips separate Hobart Avenue to the north, and Chatham Road to the south, from the railway line. The only structure that has ever stood directly adjacent to the line is the railroad station.

20th century
In 1944, the Hartshorn family also donated Crescent Park to Millburn Township, directly across from the station, with the stipulation that the park always remain open to the public.

After 17 houses were erected, Hartshorn turned his attention to other "common elements." These included a Music Hall, which later became the Short Hills Racquets Club.

Stewart Hartshorn died in 1937 at the age of 97. His daughter Cora survived him, wrote her own history of the hamlet, and helped establish the Arboretum that bears her name.

In 1968, Temple B'nai Jeshurun relocated from Newark, New Jersey, to a  site in Short Hills. It is the oldest Reform Jewish congregation in New Jersey and, with 1,100 member families, one of the largest Jewish congregations in the state at the time of the move.  Most of the property was purchased from Congressman Robert Kean, father of future New Jersey governor Thomas Kean.  The land had been given to Kean's family by King George III of the United Kingdom.

In 1975, the Millburn-Short Hills Historical Society formed in conjunction with the American Bicentennial celebrations. The opening of the Kearny Connection in 1996, establishing direct rail service to Penn Station in Midtown Manhattan, enhanced real-estate values immensely.

21st century

In 2001, the Christopher and Dana Reeve Paralysis Resource Center opened in Short Hills.

In 2002, local residents planted a memorial tree on the grounds of the railroad station, to honor those of their neighbors who died in the attacks on September 11, 2001.

In 2011, the historic Greenwood Gardens opened to the public.  It is one of sixteen garden preservation projects in the United States overseen by the Garden Conservancy.

The median family income was over $200,000 in the 2010 census. Dun & Bradstreet has its headquarters in Short Hills.

Short Hills has five K-4 elementary schools that are part of the Millburn Township Public Schools: 
Deerfield Elementary School, 
Glenwood Elementary School, 
Hartshorn Elementary School,   
South Mountain Elementary School and 
Wyoming Elementary School. For 5th grade, students attend the Washington School. Students move on to complete their public school education at 
Millburn Middle School for grades 6–8 and 
Millburn High School for grades 9–12. Short Hills is also home to the Far Brook School, a private day school serving students in nursery through eighth grade and the Pingry School Lower Campus for grades K-5.

Though Short Hills has its own railroad station and post-office branch, it does not have an independent government. It remains today a part of the Township of Millburn, as it has been since its inception. Short Hills has a "downtown" business area that is smaller than downtown Millburn. Located along Chatham Road near the Short Hills railroad station, it includes the post office, a pharmacy, small eateries and specialty shops. The train station waiting room operates as a bar and grill during the evening hours and a newsstand and ticket agent are present from early morning hours until noon.

Short Hills is also home to the Short Hills Club, Racquets Club of Short Hills, and the main portion of Canoe Brook Country Club.

Geography
According to the United States Census Bureau, the CDP had a total area of 5.211 square miles (13.497 km2), including 5.196 square miles (13.459 km2) of land and 0.015 square miles (0.039 km2) of water (0.29%).

Climate
The climate in this area is characterized by hot, humid summers and generally cool to cold winters.  According to the Köppen Climate Classification system, Short Hills has a humid continental climate, abbreviated "Dfa" on climate maps.

Demographics

According to an analysis in Time magazine in 2014, Short Hills is the wealthiest community in the United States in terms of having the highest percentage of households (69%) with incomes above $150,000 per year. According to Forbes magazine, the median income in Short Hills is $229,222.

Census 2010

The Census Bureau's 2006-2010 American Community Survey showed that (in 2010 inflation-adjusted dollars) median household income was $211,989 (with a margin of error of +/- $13,467) and the median family income was $227,262 (+/- $22,938). Males had a median income of $192,625 (+/- $33,436) versus $98,214 (+/- $12,561) for females. The per capita income for the CDP was $100,875 (+/- $7,868). About 0.6% of families and 0.7% of the population were below the poverty line, including 0.7% of those under age 18 and 0.0% of those age 65 or over.

Media references 
Philip Roth's first book, Goodbye, Columbus, is mostly set in Short Hills, the home of Neil Klugman's girlfriend and her family.

Short Hills is covered by HomeTowne TV of Summit NJ, which provides local programming and highlights the community.

The local newspapers are The Item of Millburn and Short Hills, TAPinto Millburn/Short Hills, The Millburn Patch, and The Star Ledger; most New York metro papers are also available.

Notable people 

People who were born in, residents of, or otherwise closely associated with Short Hills include:
 Lee Bickmore (1908–1986), chairman of the board and CEO of Nabisco.
 Courtney Brosnan (born 1995), professional soccer player who plays as a goalkeeper for West Ham United F.C. Women of the Women's Super League.
 Andrew Catalon (born 1980), sportscaster who has announced NFL on CBS, PGA Tour on CBS, College Basketball on CBS and NCAA March Madness.
 Ralph Cicerone (1943-2016) atmospheric scientist and administrator, who served as president of the National Academy of Sciences.
 Richard Coogan (1914–2014), actor best known for playing the lead role in Captain Video and His Video Rangers.
 Leon G. Cooperman (born 1943), businessman, investor and philanthropist who is chairman and CEO of Omega Advisors, Inc.
 Joseph P. Day, early land auctioneer and real-estate broker.
 Ina Drew, former Chief Investment Officer at JP Morgan Chase who resigned following the 2012 JPMorgan Chase trading loss that resulted in billions in losses to the bank.
 Daniel Errico, children's book author and children's media content creator who is the creator and executive producer of Hulu's kids TV series The Bravest Knight.
 John Ferolito, founder and owner of Arizona Beverage Company.
 Anne Hathaway (born 1982), actress.
 Herbert G. Hopwood (1898–1966) four-star admiral in the United States Navy.
 Ariel Horn, novelist and teacher.
 Dara Horn (born 1977), novelist and professor of literature.
 Peter Kellogg (born 1943), director of the Wall Street investment firm Spear, Leeds & Kellogg.
 Joe Kernen (born 1956), CNBC news anchor and host of Squawk Box.
 Eileen Kraus (1938–2017), business executive and president of Connecticut National Bank
 Igor Larionov (born 1960), center who played for the New Jersey Devils.
 David Levithan (born 1972, class of 1990) young adult fiction author and editor.
 Robert D. Lilley (1912–1986), businessman who served as the president of the American Telephone and Telegraph Company (AT&T) from 1972 to 1976.
 Robert Marcus, CEO of Time Warner Cable.
 Billy McFarland (born 1991), entrepreneur, convicted fraudster and founder of the Fyre Festival.
 John C. McGinley (born 1959), actor known for his role playing Dr. Perry Cox on Scrubs.
 Belva Plain (1919–2010), author.
 Mary Reckford (born 1992), rower who competed in the women's lightweight double sculls event at the 2020 Summer Olympics.
 Brian Rolston (born 1973), professional hockey player for the New Jersey Devils.
 Alex Rosenberg (born 1991), basketball player who plays for Hapoel Afula B.C. of the Israeli National League.
 Bess Rous, actress.
 Cory Schneider (born 1986), goalie for the New Jersey Devils.
 Patti Stanger (born 1961), matchmaker and producer of Millionaire Matchmaker.
 Janet Sorg Stoltzfus, (1931–2004), educator, who established the Ta'iz Cooperative School, the first non-religious school in north Yemen.
 Peter Van Sant (born 1953), reporter 48 Hours.
 James Wallwork (born 1930), politician who served in both houses of the New Jersey Legislature.
 Wang Yung-ching (1917–2008), former CEO and co-founder of Formosa Plastics Group.
 Thomas Watson Jr. (1914-1993), second President of IBM and United States Ambassador to the Soviet Union.
 Zygi Wilf (born 1950), owner of the Minnesota Vikings.
 Rachel Zoe (born 1971), fashion stylist.
 Alan Zweibel (born 1950), producer and writer for stage and television productions such as Saturday Night Live.

Points of interest 
 Cora Hartshorn Arboretum and Bird Sanctuary
 Greenwood Gardens
 The Mall at Short Hills – a mall with a gross leasable area of 1,342,000 ft² (120,780 m²), placing it among the ten largest shopping malls in New Jersey. The mall is anchored by Bloomingdale's, Macy's, Neiman Marcus, and Nordstrom.
 Paper Mill Playhouse
 Old Short Hills Park
 Gero Park – Swimming, Baseball, Municipal Golf Course
 Saint Stephen's Cemetery & The Chapel at Short Hills - Saint Stephen's Cemetery has been serving NJ residents since 1858. The Chapel at Short Hills was later added to accommodate above-ground burials.

References

External links 

Millburn-Short Hills Historical Society
Archives of the MSHHS at the Millburn Free Public Library
Collection of old photographs of Millburn-Short Hills

Census-designated places in Essex County, New Jersey
Millburn, New Jersey